Bacillus coagulans (Weizmannia coagulans) is a lactic acid–forming bacterial species first isolated and described in 1915 by B.W. Hammer at the Iowa Agricultural Experiment Station as a cause of an outbreak of coagulation in evaporated milk packed by an Iowa condensary. Separately isolated in 1935 and described as Lactobacillus sporogenes in the fifth edition of Bergey's Manual of Systematic Bacteriology, it exhibits characteristics typical of both genera Lactobacillus and Bacillus; its taxonomic position between the families Lactobacillaceae and Bacillaceae was often debated. However, in the seventh edition of Bergey's, it was finally transferred to the genus Bacillus. DNA-based technology was used in distinguishing between the two genera of bacteria, which are morphologically similar and possess similar physiological and biochemical characteristics.

Bacillus coagulans is a Gram-positive, catalase-positive, spore-forming, motile, facultative anaerobe rod that measures approximately 0.9 μm by 3.0 μm to 5.0 μm. It may appear Gram negative when entering the stationary phase of growth. The optimum temperature for growth is 50 °C (122 °F); the range of temperatures tolerated is 30–55 °C (86–131 °F). IMViC tests VP and MR (methyl red) are positive.

This species has been recently transferred into the genus Weizmannia.

Uses
Bacillus coagulans has been added by the EFSA to their Qualified Presumption of Safety list and has been approved for veterinary purposes as GRAS by the U.S. Food and Drug Administration's Center for Veterinary Medicine, as well as by the European Union, and is listed by AAFCO for use as a direct-fed microbial in livestock production. It is often used in veterinary applications, especially as a probiotic in pigs, cattle, poultry, and shrimp. Many references to use of this bacterium in humans exist, especially in improving the vaginal flora, improving abdominal pain and bloating in irritable bowel syndrome patients, and increasing immune response to viral challenges. There is evidence from animal research that suggests that Bacillus coagulans is effective in both treating as well as preventing recurrence of clostridium difficile associated diarrhea. Further, one animal research study showed that it can alter inflammatory processes in the context of multiple sclerosis. One strain of this bacterium has also been assessed for safety as a food ingredient.  Spores are activated in the acidic environment of the stomach and begin germinating and proliferating in the intestine. Sporeforming B. coagulans strains are used in some countries as probiotics for patients on antibiotics
.

Marketing
Bacillus coagulans  is often marketed as Lactobacillus sporogenes or a 'sporeforming lactic acid bacterium' probiotic, but this is an outdated name due to taxonomic changes in 1939. Although B. coagulans does produce L+lactic acid, the bacterium used in these products is not a lactic-acid bacterium, as Bacillus species do not belong to the lactic acid bacteria.  By definition, lactic acid bacteria (Lactobacillus, Bifidobacterium) do not form spores. Therefore, using the name Lactobacillus sporogenes is scientifically incorrect.

References

Notes

External links
 
 
 

coagulans
Digestive system
Probiotics
Bacteria described in 1915